Kona Eedaithe is a 1995 Indian Kannada-language legal comedy drama film directed by B. Jayashree Devi and produced by J. K. Bharavi. The story is adapted from Abhaya Katha Vibhaga movie company. The film starred Vishnuvardhan, Kumar Govind, Vinaya Prasad and Vanitha Vasu while Sudharani made a guest appearance. The film's music is scored by Hamsalekha whilst the cinematography is by H. G. Raju.

The film released on 10 February 1995 to positive response from critics and audience.

Cast
Vishnuvardhan as Advocate Vishnu
Kumar Govind as Krishna & Gaya Ramayya of Batralli Village
Vinaya Prasad as Nyaya Devathe (Symbol of Justice)
Vanitha Vasu as lover of Kumar Govind who filed case against him as he has raped her.
Anjali as another lover of Kumar Govind who filed case against him as he is impotent.
Sudharani as Vishnu's wife (guest appearance)
Umashree as Batralli Gaya Ramayya's maiden.
C. R. Simha as Vanitha's father
Mukhyamantri Chandru as Judge
Ramesh Bhat as Dr. Sahadeva Veterinary Doctor of Batralli
Sihi Kahi Chandru Gaya Ramayya's man
Doddanna as Gaya Ramayya's man
Ashalatha as Anyaya Devathe (Symbol of Injustice)
Shivaram as Baba
Sarigama Viji as Baba's assistant
Dingri Nagaraj as Gaya Ramayya's man
Bangalore Nagesh as Gaya Ramayya's man
Lohithaswa as Anjali's father
Bank Janardhan as Inspector
Kunigal Vasanth as Health Minister of Government of Karnataka
Ashok Badaradinni

Controversy
When this movie come before the Indian Censor Board, censor denied certification by citing as This movie mocking the Law of India. But after more than 30 cuts movie passed with U certificate.

Soundtrack
The music of the film was composed and lyrics written by Hamsalekha. After release, the soundtrack was well received and the song "Aaha Namma Konake Seemantha" became very popular. Audio was released on Jhankar Music label.

References

1995 films
1990s Kannada-language films
Indian comedy-drama films
Films scored by Hamsalekha